Michele Uva (born in Matera, Italy, 8 November 1964) is an international sports administrator. He is the UEFA director of football and social responsibility since January 2021. He was UEFA vice president and UEFA executive committee member from May 2017 to October 2020 and Italian FA chief executive officer from 12 September 2014 to December 2018. Author of six books, UEFA Sustainability Strategy 2030 and several publications. The Financial Times considered him as "one of Europe's most powerful football executives" and l'Equipe gave him the nick name of "jeune loop".

Career 

Graduate at University of Bologna, over the last 30 years Uva has performed several roles in several sports organisations: Italian Olympic Committee, professional football - clubs, Football association and Serie A League - basketball and volleyball.

Volleyball 

In 1985, Uva made his first steps in professional sport becoming the Head of the Youth Sector at Zinella Volley Bologna, a team he previously played for.
He then became team manager of Sisley Treviso, part of the Benetton Group, before moving - in 1992 - becoming CEO of women's volleyball professional club . During his four-year term, the Club enjoyed a highly successful run winning two Champions Leagues, a European Supercup, three Italian Leagues and three Italian Cups. In 1996, he was nominated President of the Italian Women's Volleyball League.

Football 

In the summer of 1996, Uva took his first managerial role in football as he was appointed CEO of Parma AC Football Club. Under his guidance, the club won a UEFA Cup, an Italian Cup and an Italian Supercup, being twice runners-up in the Italian Serie A. His first manager in Parma was Carlo Ancelotti

In 2001, Uva moved to S.S. Lazio becoming the club's CEO and vice-president. His experience at Lazio ended swiftly with Uva growing restless with President Sergio Cragnotti and leaving his post in November 2002.

In 2004, after a consultancy role for US football club New York MetroStars, he became Director of the Italian branch and international consultant of SPORT + MARKT AG, a German sport consultancy company based in Cologne.

Basketball 

In 2006, Uva joined basketball club Lottomatica Virtus Roma as CEO reaching the Serie A Scudetto Finals and the Euroleague Top-16 on both occasions. He departed from the club at the expiration of his 2-year contract.

Italian Football Association and Italian Olympic Committee 
In 2009, Uva returned to football joining FIGC (Italian Football Association), initially as a Project Manager for the UEFA EURO 2016 Bid and then as Chief Development Officer. The department he established covered the following areas: Social Responsibility, Research, Fundraising, Management Development, Stadiums’ Safety and Security, International Partnerships, Cultural Promotion and Special Projects.

During his first spell at FIGC, Uva started his collaboration with UEFA (Uefa Delegate, Stadia Management Expert, member of the working group on “NA financial benchmarking tool”) and FIFA (Instructor and Match Officer).

In 2013, Uva was appointed as CEO of Italian Olympic Committee CONI SpA the operative company managing all Italian National Olympic Committee's assets, activities and administrative tasks, including the Human Resources. He was in charge with the Italian team expedition at the Sochi Winter Olympic Games.

Uva was strongly linked to AC Milan following a turnover at the club; these rumours were initially dismissed by the head of the Italian National Olympic Committee, Giovanni Malagò. Uva subsequently confirmed that he had been on the verge of joining the club.

Uva eventually left CONI in September 2014, returning to FIGC as chief executive officer. He led the Federation under the turbulent days following Italy's World Cup qualifier elimination against Sweden and the resignation of President Carlo Tavecchio and has been confirmed in his role by Giovanni Malagò following the Federation's commissionership by CONI.

In the summer 2018, following AC Milan's change of ownership, with the American investment fund Elliott taking over Chinese investor Li Yonghong, Uva was once again linked to the club. Uva emerged as a candidate for the CEO. As reported by Sky, despite being honoured by this offer, Uva turned down the position in order to continue his mandate as FIGC chief executive officer and UEFA vice-president. During a personal interview with UEFA Direct Magazine, Uva had previously revealed to be an admirer of Arrigo Sacchi's Milan side.

UEFA 

On 5 April 2017, Uva was elected to the UEFA Executive Committee after the European confederation's 41st Ordinary Congress. He polled 46 votes from 55. In September of the same year, Uva became UEFA vice-president. He replaced the former president of the Spanish Football Federation, Ángel María Villar Llona.

He held the following roles at UEFA:
 UEFA Executive Committee (vice-president)
 Club Licensing Committee (chairman)
 Women's Football Committee (deputy chairman)
 Finance Committee (member)
 Professional Football Strategic Council (member)
 Club Competition SA (board member)
 UEFA Strategic Steering Committee
 National Team Committee (deputy chairman)

Lecturing and publications 

Uva lectures at numerous universities and master courses in Europe.

He has published the following books on sports and football industries
 La ripartenza, 2010, Ed. AREL - Il Mulino. Authors: M. Uva & G. Teotino
 Viaggio nello sport italiano, Ed. ESF - 2011 Authors: M. Uva & M. Vitale
 Il calcio ai tempi dello spread, 2012, Ed. AREL - Il Mulino. Authors: M. Uva, G. Teotino with the collaboration of N. Donna
Viaggio nello sport italiano, Ed. ICS - 2013 . Authors: M. Uva & M. Vitale
 Il Calcio Conta, 2014. Ed. Rai ERI e BUR. Authors: M. Uva, N. Donna & G. Teotino
 Campionesse. Storie vincenti del calcio femminile, 2018. Ed. GIUNTI. Authors: M. Uva & M. Gasparri

AWARDS		

“Stella di bronzo” Italian Olympic Committee – 2015

"Riconoscimento Speciale" Maestrelli trophy - 2015

Price USSI - 2016

“Maurizio Maestrelli” – 2016

Title of Commendator of the Republic of San Marino - 2018"

Personal life 

Uva is married to TV presenter Valentina Arrigo and has one son, Gabriele, who enjoys football as well.

References 

UEFA officials
Living people
1964 births
University of Bologna alumni
Parma Calcio 1913 chairmen and investors
S.S. Lazio